Samuel A. Snieg was chief rabbi in the American Zone of the Allied-occupied Germany, a survivor of the Dachau concentration camp, and an organizer of the printing of the Survivors' Talmud.

References

Dachau concentration camp survivors